Donald Claude Dobbins (March 20, 1878 – February 14, 1943) was a U.S. Representative from Illinois.

Born on a farm near Dewey, Illinois, Dobbins attended public school, the University of Illinois Urbana-Champaign, Dixon Business College, and George Washington University. He then worked as a stenographer from 1900–1906, later working as a post office inspector from 1906–1909. He studied law and was admitted to the bar in 1909, commencing practice in Champaign, Illinois. He served as delegate to the Democratic National Convention at Philadelphia in 1936.

Dobbins was elected as a Democrat to the Seventy-third and Seventy-fourth Congresses (March 4, 1933 – January 3, 1937). He was not a candidate for renomination in 1936, so he resumed his practice of law. He died in Champaign, Illinois, February 14, 1943 and was interred in Mount Hope Cemetery.

References

1878 births
1943 deaths
Democratic Party members of the United States House of Representatives from Illinois
People from Champaign, Illinois
George Washington University alumni